Kim Yong-woo (April 29, 1912 – September 18, 1985) was the first Tiger Scout and former Minister of National Defense, served as the Chief Scout of the Korea Scout Association.

In 1975, Kim was awarded the 100th Bronze Wolf Award, the only distinction of the World Organization of the Scout Movement, awarded by the World Scout Committee for exceptional services to world Scouting, at the 25th World Scout Conference.

External links

complete list

http://fr.scoutwiki.org/Yong-Woo_Kim

Recipients of the Bronze Wolf Award
1912 births
Scouting in South Korea
South Korean writers
South Korean academics
Ambassadors of South Korea to the United Kingdom
National Defense ministers of South Korea
Members of the National Assembly (South Korea)
University of Southern California alumni
Yonsei University alumni
People from Seoul
Andong Kim clan
1985 deaths